Numerous vessels have borne the name Lusitania, named after Lusitania, an ancient Roman province corresponding to most of modern Portugal. The most famous was:

  (launched 1906), a British ocean liner operated by the Cunard Steamship Company sunk by a German U-boat in World War I

Other vessels include:
  that a French frigate captured in 1813 and released, and that between 1826 and 1830 made a whaling voyage to Timor and the waters around Papua New Guinea.
  was an Orient Steam Navigation Company ocean liner wrecked off Nova Scotia in 1901
  (built 1906), a Portuguese liner wrecked on Bellows Rock, Cape Point on 18 April 1911

Citations

Ship names